The Dallas–Fort Worth metroplex is located inside of the Bible Belt, and is home to three of the twenty-five largest megachurches in the country. According to Pew Research as of 2014, the Dallas–Fort Worth metroplex has the largest Christian population by percentage out of any large metropolitan area in the United States at 78%. 46.8% of metroplex residents are highly religious, and 29.6% are moderately religious. In a 2017 survey, 37% of metroplex residents reported reading the Bible in the past week and strongly agreeing that the Bible is accurate, the 25th highest percentage among U.S. cities.

List of notable churches

Demographics 
As of 2014, according to Pew Research, Evangelical Protestants (includes family denominations under Baptist, Methodist, Lutheran, Pentecostal and more churches) are the largest religious group at 38%, followed by the unaffiliated at 18%, Catholicism at 15% and Mainline Protestants (includes American Baptist Churches USA, United Methodist Church, ELCA, Presbyterian Church and more) at 14%.

As of 2000 the Dallas Metropolitan Community Church (MCC), an LGBT-friendly church, has 3,000 members, making it the largest MCC in the United States.

References 

Dallas-Fort Worth
Dallas–Fort Worth metroplex